Yaka may refer to:

Places in Turkey
Yaka, Başmakçı
Yaka, Bozdoğan
Yaka, Düzce
Yaka, Isparta
Yaka, Kastamonu
Yaka, Kemaliye
Yaka, Tavas
Yaka, Yapraklı
Yaka Castle or Güdübeş Castle, a castle ruin in Mersin Province

Other uses
Yaka (Star Wars), a fictional alien species in the Star Wars franchise
Yaka Bāgh or Yekkeh Bagh, Torbat-e Jam, a village in Razavi Khorasan Province, Iran
Yaka, Central African Republic, near Mbokassa
Yaka, Togo
Yaka language (disambiguation)
Yaka people, an African ethnic group
Yaka Station, a train station in Himeji, Hyōgo Prefecture, Japan

See also 
 Yaca (disambiguation)
 Yakan (disambiguation)

Language and nationality disambiguation pages